Sam Borenstein (15 January 1908 – 15 December 1969) was a Canadian painter. During his forty-year career he painted numerous scenes of Montreal and Laurentian villages and Quebec landscapes bustling with human activity, using brilliant colours and exuberant brushwork. Borenstein was best known for his expressionistic cityscapes and rural scenes, but also produced numerous portraits and still lifes.

Career

Born in Kalvarija, Lithuania, Russian Empire  in 1908, Borenstein immigrated to Canada in 1921, and moved to Montreal with his father and one of his sisters. He spent two years in Ottawa, then returned to Montreal, where he worked in the garment industry. Although he had little formal training, Borenstein took evening art classes, studying sculpture with Elzéar Soucy and drawing with Adam Sheriff Scott and John Young Johnstone, and associating with local artists Alexandre Bercovitch, Fritz Brandtner, Herman Heimlich, and Louis Muhlstock. His first solo exhibition took place in 1934 at the Coffee House café in Montreal. In 1938, in Montreal, he saw the work of Chaïm Soutine at W. Scott & Sons. During a six-month painting trip to Brittany in 1939, Borenstein saw the work of painters such as Vincent van Gogh. Within months of his return to Canada, he had a show at the Sidney Carter Art Gallery in Montreal and was invited to join the Contemporary Arts Society. He painted in the Laurentians from the 1940s.

In 1966, three years before he died, Borenstein was the subject of a retrospective exhibit at the new Art Gallery of Sir George Williams University (now Concordia University). In 1992, Joyce Borenstein, the artist's daughter, a film animator and artist in her own right, produced an animated film entitled The Colours of My Father: A Portrait of Sam Borenstein, which was nominated for an Academy Award. In 2005, there was a Borenstein retrospective titled Sam Borenstein: The Colours of Montreal curated by Jacques Des Rochers and Loren Lerner for the Montreal Museum of Fine Arts, which toured across Canada. His paintings also were included in the Jewish Painters of Montreal exhibition at the McCord Museum/The Musée national des beaux-arts du Québec in 2008. In 2011, an abridged version of the Montreal retrospective in 2005 opened at the Yeshiva University Museum in New York. It was the first solo show devoted to Borenstein outside of Canada.

References

External links
 Sam Borenstein website
 Sam Borenstein: Synesthesia and the Fusion of Senses Page

Artists from Montreal
Canadian people of Lithuanian-Jewish descent
Lithuanian Jews
Lithuanian emigrants to Canada
Jewish Canadian artists
Jewish painters
20th-century Canadian Jews
1908 births
1969 deaths
20th-century Canadian painters
Canadian male painters
People from Kalvarija, Lithuania
20th-century Canadian male artists
Jews and Judaism in Montreal